Nepal has provided an exotic and mystical backdrop to numerous international films set mostly or partly in Nepal. A good many overseas films shot in Nepal come from Bollywood and Hollywood film industries, which are two of the biggest cinema industries in the world. 

The following is a compilation of foreign films shot largely or partly in Nepal. The list, however, doesn't cover those that were set in Nepal but shot elsewhere, such as The Expendables 2.

#
 10 Endrathukulla

A
 The Arabian Nights
 Aandhi-Toofan

B
 Banarasi Babu
 Baby
 Baraka
 Beyond the Edge
 Beqabu

D
 Doctor Strange
 Deewana Main Deewana

E
 Everest
 Even When I Fall

F
 The Fall

G
 Gharwali Baharwali
 The Golden Child

H
 High Ground
 Highway to Dhampus
 Himalaya
 The Himalayas
  Hare Rama Hare Krishna

I
India's Most Wanted
Intlo Illalu Vantintlo Priyuralu

J
 Johny Mera Naam

K
 Katmandu, A Mirror in the Sky
 Khuda Gawah
 Kathmandu (TV series)
 Kathmandu Connection
 Khoj (1989 film)

L
 The Legend of Wisely
 Little Buddha
 Love in Nepal

M
Mahaan

P
Padi Padi Leche Manasu
Powaqqatsi

R
 Returned: Child Soldiers of Nepal's Maoist Army**

S
 Seven Years in Tibet
 Sherpa

T
 Thaikulame Thaikulame The Third Generation
 To the North of Katmandu The Touch
  The Sari Soldiers
 The Fall The Wildest Dream The ClimbU
 Up to His EarsW
 The Wildest Dream Witch from NepalY
 Yevade Subramanyam''
 Yodha
Yudh
 Yaara

References

films